The following radio stations broadcast on FM frequency 90.5 MHz:

Argentina

 Algarrobo in Villarino, Buenos Aires
 Amistad in Berazategui, Buenos Aires
 Chajari in Chajarí, Entre Ríos
 Concierto in Oliva, Córdoba
 Cuyen Radio in Junín, Buenos Aires
 del litoral in General Ramirez, Entre Ríos
 El Aguante in Taco Pozo, Chaco
 Factory in La Verde, Chaco
 La Voz in Campo Grande, 
 Futura in La Plata, Buenos Aires
 Info Villegas in General Villegas, Buenos Aires
 Juventud in Maggiolo, Santa Fe
 LRH 356 Güemes in Juan Jose Castelli, Chaco
 La 990 Radio (Rosario) in Rosario, Santa Fe
 Libertad in Esperanza, Santa Fe
 Mitre Concepción del Uruguay in Concepción del Uruguay, Entre Ríos
 Nexo in Necochea, Buenos Aires
 NVR "la radio" in Navarro, Buenos Aires
 Nueva Vida in Villa Ángela, Chaco
 Patagonia in Carmen de Patagones, Buenos Aires
 Piuquén in San Rafael, Mendoza
 Power in General Belgrano, Buenos Aires
 Quality in Córdoba
 Radio el trébol in El Trébol, Santa Fe
 Radio María in Balcarce, Buenos Aires
 Radio María in Pascanas, Córdoba
 Radio María in General Güemes, Salta
 Radio Uno in Tucuman
 Región in Lomas de Zamora, Buenos Aires
 Sensación in Oro verde, Entre Rios
 Signos in Arribeños, Buenos Aires
 Studio in Capilla del Señor, Buenos Aires
 SunSet in Caleta Olivia, Santa Cruz
 Tribunales in Buenos Aires
 Virasoro in Goya, Corrientes

Australia
 2CCR in Sydney, New South Wales
 2KY in Tamworth, New South Wales
 EZY FM in Lithgow, New South Wales
 Monaro FM in Cooma, New South Wales
 4RBL - Rebel Media Co. in Gold Coast, Queensland
 7PNN in Burnie, Tasmania
 ABC Local Radio in Queenstown, Tasmania

Canada (Channel 213)

 CBAE-FM in Campbellton, New Brunswick
 CBCV-FM in Victoria, British Columbia
 CBEA-FM in Red Lake, Ontario
 CBHA-FM in Halifax, Nova Scotia
 CBLA-FM-1 in Crystal Beach, Ontario
 CBN-FM-3 in Deer Lake, Newfoundland and Labrador
 CBNJ-FM in Port Saunders, Newfoundland and Labrador
 CBQQ-FM in Fort Frances, Ontario
 CBTT-FM in Tahsis, British Columbia
 CBUF-FM-2 in Kelowna, British Columbia
 CBWB-FM in Wabowden, Manitoba
 CFCH-FM in North Bay, Ontario 
 CFCR-FM in Saskatoon, Saskatchewan
 CHCK-FM in Carmacks, Yukon
 CHHJ-FM in Haines Junction, Yukon
 CHOL-FM in Old Crow, Yukon
 CHON-FM-1 in Klukshu, Yukon
 CHON-FM-2 in Takhini, Yukon
 CHON-FM-3 in Johnson's Crossing, Yukon
 CHON-FM-4 in Dease Lake, British Columbia
 CHPE-FM in Pelly Crossing, Yukon
 CHQX-FM-1 in Waskesiu Lake, Saskatchewan
 CHTE-FM in Teslin, Yukon
 CISF-FM in Swan Lake, Manitoba
 CJBE-FM in Port-Menier, Quebec
 CJMB-FM in Peterborough, Ontario
 CJPN-FM in Fredericton, New Brunswick
 CKBN-FM in Bécancour-Nicolet, Quebec
 CKRD-FM in Red Deer, Alberta
 CKSI-FM in Thunder Bay, Ontario
 CKXM-FM in Exeter, Ontario
 VF2024 in Burwash Landing, Yukon
 VF2027 in Watson Lake, Yukon
 VF2028 in Mayo, Yukon
 VF2035 in Ross River, Yukon
 VF2039 in Carcross, Yukon
 VF2049 in Dawson City, Yukon
 VF2075 in Burgeo, Newfoundland and Labrador
 VF2091 in Little Buffalo, Alberta
 VF2125 in Beaver Creek, British Columbia
 VF2126 in Keno Hill, Yukon
 VF2127 in Stewart Crossing, Yukon
 VF2128 in Tagish, Yukon
 VF2216 in Mont-Wright, Quebec
 VF2296 in Burton, British Columbia
 VF2354 in Aklavik, Northwest Territories
 VF2414 in Faro, Yukon
 VF2498 in Tsiigehtchic, Northwest Territories
 VF7090 in Zenon Park, Saskatchewan
 VF7124 in Trenton, Ontario
 VF7142 in Trenton, Ontario

China 
 CNR China Traffic Radio in Hunan Province and Changchun
 CNR The Voice of China in Yuxi
 CRI News Radio in Beijing

Japan
 TBS Radio in Tokyo

Malaysia
 Ai FM in Kuala Terengganu, Terengganu
 Hot FM in North Perak, Padang Rengas, Kuala Kangsar, Central Perak, parts of South Perak and parts of Hilir Perak 
 Minnal FM in Negeri Sembilan

Mexico

XEDA-FM in Mexico City
XHAVE-FM in Guasave, Sinaloa
XHCCE-FM in Chetumal, Quintana Roo
XHCGO-FM in Ciudad Camargo, Tamaulipas
XHECO-FM in Tecomán, Colima
XHFL-FM in Ciudad Obregón, Sonora
XHHM-FM in Ciudad Delicias, Chihuahua
XHKF-FM in Iguala, Guerrero
XHMZL-FM in Mazatlán, Sinaloa
XHPCIE-FM in Cuatro Ciénegas-Monclova, Coahuila
XHSCEE-FM in Purépero, Michoacán
XHRUV-FM in Xalapa, Veracruz
XHRYN-FM in Reynosa, Tamaulipas
XHTI-FM in Tempoal, Veracruz
XHTX-FM in Nuevo Casas Grandes, Chihuahua
XHUDEM-FM in Monterrey (San Pedro Garza García), Nuevo León
XHUTU-FM in Emiliano Zapata, Tabasco
XHUVA-FM in Aguascalientes, Aguascalientes
XHVET-FM in La Venta, Tabasco
XHVW-FM in Acámbaro, Guanajuato
XHXOX-FM in Oaxaca (Santa Cruz Xoxocotlán), Oaxaca
XHYG-FM in Matías Romero, Oaxaca
XHZIH-FM in Zihuatanejo, Guerrero

Philippines
 DYSB in Kalibo

Singapore
 Gold 905 in Singapore

United States (Channel 213)

  in Chehalis, Washington
 KAGT in Abilene, Texas
 KAIO (FM) in Idaho Falls, Idaho
  in Jonesboro, Arkansas
 KAUD in Mexico, Missouri
  in Weatherford, Oklahoma
  in Plainview, Texas
 KBEI in Brush, Colorado
 KBJF in Nephi, Utah
 KBLU-FM in Pilot Rock, Oregon
  in Enterprise, Kansas
  in Buffalo, Wyoming
 KBXE in Bagley, Minnesota
 KCGR in Oran, Missouri
 KCIE (FM) in Dulce, New Mexico
  in Bismarck, North Dakota
 KCPL in Astoria, Oregon
  in Fort Collins, Colorado
  in Duluth, Minnesota
 KFCV in Dixon, Missouri
 KFDJ in Glendale, Utah
  in Odessa, Texas
 KFXU in Chickasha, Oklahoma
 KGDP-FM in Santa Maria, California
 KGKD in Columbus, Nebraska
 KGVB in Holliday, Texas
 KGVV in Goltry, Oklahoma
 KGYA in Grayling, Alaska
  in Fairfield, Iowa
 KHSU in Arcata, California
  in Burney, California
 KJIC in Santa Fe, Texas
  in Butte, Montana
 KJZC in Chadron, Nebraska
  in Tahoe City, California
  in Newport, Oregon
 KLEC in Liberal, Kansas
 KLFT in Kaplan, Louisiana
 KLHW-LP in Kansas City, Missouri
 KLRE-FM in Little Rock, Arkansas
 KLXF in Modesto, California
 KLXY in Woodlake, California
 KMPI in McCoy, Texas
 KMTJ (FM) in Columbus, Montana
 KMUC in Columbia, Missouri
 KNGA in Saint Peter, Minnesota
  in Nashville, Arkansas
 KNLM in Yucca Valley, California
  in Clarkston, Washington
  in Broken Arrow, Oklahoma
 KOGW in Hartley, Texas
 KPHL in Pahala, Hawaii
 KQBC in Benton City, Washington
 KQQA in Shelton, Nebraska
  in Ottawa, Kansas
 KSHU in Huntsville, Texas
 KSJS in San Jose, California
  in Point Lookout, Missouri
 KSOS in Las Vegas, Nevada
  in Colorado Springs, Colorado
 KTLN (FM) in Thibodaux, Louisiana
 KTRL in Stephenville, Texas
 KTXG in Greenville, Texas
  in Tucson, Arizona
 KUEU in Logan, Utah
 KUFL in Libby, Montana
 KUT in Austin, Texas
  in Newcastle, Wyoming
  in Rock Springs, Wyoming
  in Freeman, South Dakota
  in Concord, California
  in Bend, Oregon
  in Carbondale, Colorado
  in Walla Walla, Washington
  in Point Reyes Station, California
  in Maryville, Missouri
  in Glennallen, Alaska
 KZBY in Coos Bay, Oregon
 KZET in Towaoc, Colorado
  in Fannett, Texas
  in Wichita Falls, Texas
  in Hill City, Kansas
 KZTU-FM in Tucumcari, New Mexico
  in Tallahassee, Florida
 WAOM in Mowrystown, Ohio
 WAPO (FM) in Mount Vernon, Illinois
  in McComb, Mississippi
  in Boone, North Carolina
 WBER in Rochester, New York
  in Lincroft, New Jersey
  in Buxton, North Carolina
  in Tampa, Florida
  in Baldwinsville, New York
  in Columbus, Ohio
 WCGD-LP in Edgar, Nebraska
  in Saint Johnsbury, Vermont
 WCNH in Concord, New Hampshire
  in Williamsport, Maryland
  in Columbus, Mississippi
  in Flemington, New Jersey
 WDCC in Sanford, North Carolina
  in Dillon, South Carolina
  in Erie, Pennsylvania
 WESA in Pittsburgh, Pennsylvania
 WFBA in Kulpmont, Pennsylvania
 WFBM (FM) in Beaver Springs, Pennsylvania
 WFRC (FM) in Columbus, Georgia
 WGGM-LP in Fort Myers, Florida
 WGLA in Nashville, Georgia
 WHQB in Gray Court, South Carolina
 WHRW in Binghamton, New York
  in Clyde, Ohio
  in Worcester, Massachusetts
  in Carolina, Puerto Rico
  in Wise, Virginia
 WJFF in Jeffersonville, New York
  in Morristown, New Jersey
  in East Lansing, Michigan
  in Worton, Maryland
 WLOM in Somers Point, New Jersey
 WMEP in Camden, Maine
  in Summersville, West Virginia
 WMTH in Park Ridge, Illinois
  in College Park, Maryland
 WMVQ in Fenner, New York
 WNIU in Rockford, Illinois
 WNPR in Meriden, Connecticut
 WPAL in Laceyville, Pennsylvania
  in Exeter, New Hampshire
 WPER in Fredericksburg, Virginia
  in Sturgeon Bay, Wisconsin
  in Gaylord, Michigan
  in Martinsville, Virginia
 WPNJ in Easton, Pennsylvania
  in Byron, Georgia
 WQRA in Greencastle, Indiana
  in Madison, Mississippi
 WRGY in Rangeley, Maine
 WRTK in Paxton, Illinois
  in Crown Point, Indiana
 WRVI in Allport, Pennsylvania
  in Springfield, Illinois
 WSLG in Gouverneur, New York
  in Saranac Lake, New York
  in Scituate, Massachusetts
  in Collegedale, Tennessee
  in Winston-Salem, North Carolina
  in Cortland, New York
 WSUP in Platteville, Wisconsin
  in Milton, Florida
 WTGX in Williamston, North Carolina
  in Somerset, Kentucky
  in Jesup, Georgia
 WTWT in Bradford, Pennsylvania
 WUMC in Elizabethton, Tennessee
 WUOG in Athens, Georgia
  in Louisville, Kentucky
  in Columbia, South Carolina
 WVBU-FM in Lewisburg, Pennsylvania
  in Medford Lakes, New Jersey
  in Eau Claire, Wisconsin
  in Lebanon, New Hampshire
  in Benton, Kentucky
  in Millersburg, Ohio
 WVRD in Zebulon, North Carolina
  in Coral Gables, Florida
 WWCU in Cullowhee, North Carolina
  in Brigantine, New Jersey
  in Wilmington, North Carolina
 WWLN in Lincoln, Maine
 WXKV in Selmer, Tennessee
 WXLQ in Bristol, Vermont
 WYDI in Derry, New Hampshire
  in Gainesville, Florida
  in Mars Hill, North Carolina
 WZEV in Lineville, Alabama
  in Norlina, North Carolina
 WZXB in Bechtelsville, Pennsylvania

References

Lists of radio stations by frequency